Yndia, stage name of India Selba Rodas (born 1964), is a singer, song writer, and actress. She is best known for adapting and singing Spanish language versions of rock classics.

Life and career
Yndia was born into a Catholic family in Asunción, Paraguay. Her father, Regino Saracho Rodas, of Guarani background, immigrated to Brazil in 1960 where he then founded the Escola Brasileira de Violão (English: "Brazilian Guitar School").

Through her father's frequent meetings with other musicians, Yndia also entered into a musical career, particularly in Spanish speaking countries.

First single
In 1989 Yndia recorded her first single with BMG Ariola Records. Her version of the song "Better be good to me" by Mike Chapman, Nicky Chinn and Holly Knight, titled "Que tu quieres de mi", reached the top spots on the Latin American charts in the early 1990s. The launch of this single won her the "Os Melhores do Paraná - Pergaminho de Ouro 1990" (English: "The Best of Paraná - Gold Parchment 1990") award. Following this, she recorded a second mixed album titled Corazon in 1993, still with BMG. This album featured "Mi Angel", a cover version of "Shine my Machine" by Suzi Quatro, and "Corazon", a cover of "One Year of Love" by John Deacon.

Discography

 Que Tu quieres de mi (1990, Paraguay)
 Corazon (1993, Brazil)
 Jurassic Rock (2001, Brazil)
 Coletânea dos melhores (2013, live in Brazil)

References

External links
 Yndia on Facebook
 Yndia on Soundcloud

1964 births
Living people
Brazilian rock singers
Brazilian rock guitarists
Brazilian women composers
Brazilian women guitarists
20th-century composers
21st-century composers
20th-century guitarists
21st-century guitarists
20th-century Brazilian women singers
20th-century Brazilian singers
21st-century Brazilian women singers
21st-century Brazilian singers
People from Asunción
Guaraní people
Indigenous musicians of the Americas
20th-century indigenous people of the Americas
Paraguayan composers
Date of birth missing (living people)
Paraguayan women musicians
Paraguayan emigrants to Brazil
20th-century women composers
21st-century women composers
20th-century women guitarists
21st-century women guitarists